Porte de Vincennes is a station on Paris Métro Line 1. It is located on the Cours de Vincennes and named after the Porte de Vincennes, a gate in the former Thiers Wall, which was at the beginning of the road to Vincennes.

History
The station opened on 19 July 1900 as part of the first stage of the line 1 between Porte de Vincennes and Porte Maillot. As the original eastern terminus of the line, Porte de Vincennes was the site of the very first construction work on the Paris Métro. An extension to Château de Vincennes subsequently opened in 1934. Originally the station consisted of two separate island platforms for arrival and departure with tracks on each side. After the extension, a track on each island was filled in to create the present wide platforms.

An interchange with an extension of Paris tramway Line 3a and the new Line 3b opened on 15 December 2012. Both routes terminate at Porte de Vincennes.

Station layout

References

Paris Métro stations in the 12th arrondissement of Paris
Paris Métro stations in the 20th arrondissement of Paris
Railway stations in France opened in 1900